Bogdanovo is a rural locality (a selo) in Fedovskoye Rural Settlement of Plesetsky District, Arkhangelsk Oblast, Russia. The population was 66 as of 2010. Bogdanovo only has one street.

Geography 
Bogdanovo is located 50 km southwest of Plesetsk (the district's administrative centre) by road. Gubino and Iyevlevo are the nearest rural localities.

References 

Rural localities in Plesetsky District